The 1992 Internazionali di Tennis San Marino was a women's tennis tournament played on outdoor clay courts at the Centro Sportivo Tennis in the City of San Marino, San Marino that was part of the Tier V category of the 1992 WTA Tour. It was the second edition of the WTA San Marino and was held from 20 July until 26 July 1992. First-seeded Magdalena Maleeva won the singles title and earned $18,000 first-prize money.

Finals

Singles

 Magdalena Maleeva defeated  Federica Bonsignori 7–6(7–3), 6–4
 It was Maleeva's first singles title of her career.

Doubles

 Alexia Dechaume /  Florencia Labat defeated  Sandra Cecchini /  Laura Garrone 7–6(8–6), 7–5

See also
 1992 Internazionali di Tennis di San Marino – men's tournament

References

External links
 ITF tournament edition details
 Tournament draws

WTA San Marino
WTA San Marino
1992 in San Marino
San Marino